Whitecourt Airport  is located  west of Whitecourt, Alberta, Canada.

The Whitecourt Airport was opened in 1978. It is serviced by three non-precision IFR approaches. The approach lighting consists of PAPI3 and medium intensity runway lighting.

The airport is open 24 hours a day, with the Nav Canada Flight Services office open from 6 AM to 10 PM, 7 days a week.

An Alberta Agriculture And Forestry fire suppression tanker base is located at the south east side of the airport at the intersection of taxiway B and A.

Fuel sales of AVGAS or jet fuel are available during working hours with call out service available.

Airlines and destinations

References

External links 

Place to Fly on COPA's Places to Fly airport directory

Registered aerodromes in Alberta
Whitecourt
Woodlands County